Carin Bondar (born 20 May 1975) is a Canadian biologist, writer, filmmaker, speaker and television personality. She is a host of Outrageous Acts of Science, Stephen Hawking's Brave New World, and Worlds Oddest Animal Couples.

Personal life
Bondar was born in New Westminster and grew up near Vancouver, British Columbia. She comes from a small family of French-Canadian, Russian and British ancestry. She met mathematician Ian Affleck in 1995, became engaged in 1999 and married in 2001. The couple separated in 2013 and divorced in 2017; they have four children.

After receiving a BSc from Simon Fraser University in 1999, she completed an MSc in evolution and development at the University of Victoria in 2001 and a PhD in freshwater population ecology from the University of British Columbia. Bondar was forced to put her PhD studies on hold in 2005 while she took over a family business after the deaths of her father John Paul and her brother William Paul. She re-enrolled after a year's leave and completed her PhD in 2007.

Career
Bondar began a career in science communication while raising her four young children in Chilliwack, British Columbia. Her first book, The Nature of Human Nature and her own personal biology blog led her to a blogging position with Scientific American in 2011. She was invited to appear in the Science Channel's Outrageous Acts of Science in its first season, and she has maintained a hosting position on this TV show for all of its 6 seasons.

Bondar has since written two more books and written/hosted several web and television programs on major networks. She has worked with The Science Channel, Discovery Channel, Animal Planet, Netflix and National Geographic Wild. Her independent web series Wild Sex (produced by Earth Touch, a South African based natural history film production company), has engaged over 60 million viewers. She presented on this topic at TED Global in Edinburgh, Scotland in 2013 – "The Birds and the Bees are just the Beginning".

Bondar is currently a writer and host of Wild Sex, an animated series based on her book of the same title. She also wrote a book called "Wild Moms", for release in early 2018. In addition to her media work and writing, Bondar holds an adjunct professorship in the department of biology at the University of the Fraser Valley in British Columbia, and works with Taxon Expeditions, a Netherlands-based company that engages citizen scientists on scientific expeditions to discover new species. The group mainly works in the Sabah region of Borneo and has thus far discovered 7 new species.

Bondar is known for her bold approach to science storytelling. She has received accolades and global media-coverage for her music video parodies including a play on Miley Cyrus' "Wrecking Ball." She has appeared in several live events including I F*#cking Love Science Live, the Australian National Science Week, and the Bay Area Science Festival.

Books
 The Nature of Human Nature : Lulu Press
 The Nature of Sex:  The Ins and Outs of Mating in the Animal Kingdom (Orion, UK)
 Wild Sex (Pegasus, United States)
 Wild Moms (Pegasus, United States)

Television series

Web series

Awards and recognition

References

External links 
 Official website
 Carin Bondar on Internet Movie Database

1975 births
Living people
Canadian biologists
Simon Fraser University alumni
University of Victoria alumni
University of British Columbia alumni
Writers from British Columbia
Canadian science writers
Canadian television hosts
Canadian women non-fiction writers
People from New Westminster
Canadian women television hosts
Academic staff of the University of the Fraser Valley